John Buck (born 1946) is an American sculptor and printmaker who was born in Ames, Iowa.

Background and education
He received a Bachelor of Fine Arts degree from Kansas City Art Institute in 1968, and in 1971, he studied at Skowhegan School of Painting and Sculpture in Skowhegan, Maine.  In 1972, he received a Master of Fine Arts degree from the University of California, Davis.

Works
Buck is best known for his woodblock prints (such as Father and Son) and bronze sculptures (such as The Archer) that are typically cast from molds taken from wooden maquettes.  The DeCordova Museum (Lincoln, Massachusetts), the Fine Arts Museums of San Francisco, the Hawaii State Art Museum, the Honolulu Museum of Art, the Smithsonian American Art Museum (Washington D.C.) and the Yellowstone Art Museum (Montana) are among the public collections holding works by John Buck.

Personal
While studying at Davis, Buck met his wife, artist Deborah Butterfield. They married in 1974. Buck and Butterfield divide their time between a farm in Bozeman, Montana and studios on the island of Hawaii.

Further reading

 Albright, Thomas, Art in the San Francisco Bay Area 1945-1980, Berkeley, California, University of California Press, 1985.
 Buck, John, John Buck: Woodblock Prints, Fine Arts Museums of San Francisco, 1993 
 DuPont, Diana C., San Francisco Museum of Modern Art Paintings and Sculpture Collection, New York, Hudson Hills Press in association with the San Francisco Museum of Modern Art, 1985. 
 Guenther, Bruce, Documents Northwest: The Poncho Series, John Buck, Seattle Art Museum, 1984.
 Guheen, Elizabeth, John Buck, Yellowstone Art Center, 1983.
 Honolulu Museum of Art, Spalding House Self-guided Tour, Sculpture Garden, 2014, pp. 4 & 8
 Mitchell, Benjamin, John Buck: Iconography, Northwest Museum of Arts and Culture, 2008 ASIN: B01K3K1NQQ
 Tesner, Linda, John Buck, Marquand Books in association with American Folk Art Museum, New York, 2014

References

External links
 ArtCyclopedia
 Shark's Ink
John Buck at Gallery Paule Anglim in San Francisco.
 JohnBuckArt.com

20th-century American sculptors
Modern sculptors
American printmakers
Artists from Hawaii
Kansas City Art Institute alumni
Living people
University of California, Davis alumni
People from Bozeman, Montana
1946 births
21st-century American sculptors
Skowhegan School of Painting and Sculpture alumni